Joseph Blake (died 1700), the nephew of British General at Sea Robert Blake, was governor of colonial South Carolina in 1694 (chosen by the council), and from 1696 to his death 1700.

Biography 
Joseph Blake was born in 1663, in England. He was the son of Benjamin Blake and nephew of Lord Proprietor, John Archdale. To early 1680s, he emigrated to Carolina. In 1685, Joseph Blake was appointed a Deputy by his Archdale. During a time, he was member of the Executive Councils. Late, he was named as a Deputy of Peter Colleton, 2nd Baronet. On October 29, 1694, he was appointed governor of colonial South Carolina by the council, and he kept the charge until his death, on September 7, 1700.

Blake married two times: The first of them was with Deborah Morton, who was daughter of Governor Joseph Morton, marrying with him before 1685. The second was Elizabeth Axtell, who had a son, Joseph Blake Jr. He had several lands: "Plainsfield", located on the Stono River; Newington Plantation, located in Dorchester County; and "Pawlet" in Colleton County, South Carolina.

See also
List of colonial governors of South Carolina

References

Governors of South Carolina
Colonial governors of South Carolina
1700 deaths
Year of birth unknown